The list below shows the leading sire of Thoroughbred racehorses in Australia for each season since 1883–84. This is determined by the amount of prize money won by the sire's progeny during the season.

List

 2021/22 – I Am Invincible (1)
 2020/21 – Written Tycoon (1)
 2019/20 – Snitzel (4)
 2018/19 – Snitzel (3)
 2017/18 – Snitzel (2)
 2016/17 – Snitzel (1)
 2015/16 – Street Cry (1)
 2014/15 – Fastnet Rock (2)
 2013/14 – Redoute's Choice (3)
 2012/13 – Exceed and Excel (1)
 2011/12 – Fastnet Rock (1)
 2010/11 – Lonhro (1)
 2009/10 – Redoute's Choice (2)
 2008/09 – Encosta De Lago (2)
 2007/08 – Encosta De Lago (1)
 2006/07 – Flying Spur (1)
 2005/06 – Redoute's Choice (1)
 2004/05 – Danehill (9)
 2003/04 – Danehill (8)
 2002/03 – Danehill (7)
 2001/02 – Danehill (6)
 2000/01 – Danehill (5)
 1999/2000 – Danehill (4)
 1998/99 – Zabeel (2)
 1997/98 – Zabeel (1)
 1996/97 – Danehill (3)
 1995/96 – Danehill (2)
 1994/95 – Danehill (1)
 1993/94 – Last Tycoon (1)
 1992/93 – Marscay (2)
 1991/92 – Nassipour (1)
 1990/91 – Marscay (1)
 1989/90 – Sir Tristram (6)
 1988/89 – Sir Tristram (5)
 1987/88 – Zamazaan (1)
 1986/87 – Sir Tristram (4)
 1985/86 – Sir Tristram (3)
 1984/85 – Sir Tristram (2)
 1983/84 – Vain (1)
 1982/83 – Sir Tristram (1)
 1981/82 – Bletchingly (3)
 1980–81 – Bletchingly (2)
 1979/80 – Bletchingly (1)
 1978/79 – Century (1)
 1977/78 – Showdown (2)
 1976/77 – Better Boy (4)
 1975/76 – Showdown (1)
 1974/75 – Oncidium (2)
 1973/74 – Matrice (1)
 1972/73 – Oncidium (1)
 1971/72 – Better Boy (3)
 1970/71 – Better Boy (2)
 1969/70 – Alcimedes (2)
 1968/69 – Wilkes (1)
 1967/68 – Agricola (1)
 1966/67 – Alcimedes (1)
 1965/66 – Better Boy (1)
 1964/65 – Star Kingdom (5)
 1963–64 – Wilkes (2)
 1962/63 – Wilkes (1)
 1961/62 – Star Kingdom (4)
 1960/61 – Star Kingdom (3)
 1959/60 – Star Kingdom (2)
 1958/59 – Star Kingdom (1)
 1957/58 – Khorassan (1)
 1956/57 – Delville Wood (5)
 1955/56 – Delville Wood (4)
 1954/55 – Delville Wood (3)
 1953/54 – Delville Wood (2)
 1952/53 – Delville Wood (1)
 1951/52 – Midstream (3)
 1950/51 – Midstream (2)
 1949/50 – The Buzzard (2)
 1948/49 – Helios (1)
 1947/48 – Midstream (1)
 1946/47 – The Buzzard (1)
 1945/46 – Emborough (1)
 1944/45 – Manitoba (2)
 1943/44 – Manitoba (1)
 1942/43 – Spearfelt (1)
 1941/42 – Beau Pere (3)
 1940/41 – Beau Pere (2)
 1939/40 – Beau Pere (1)
 1938/39 – Heroic (7)
 1937/38 – Heroic (6)
 1936/37 – Heroic (5)
 1935/36 – Heroic (4)
 1934/35 – Heroic (3)
 1933/34 – Heroic (2)
 1932/33 – Heroic (1)
 1931/32 – Limond (1)
 1930/31 – Night Raid (2)
 1929/30 – Night Raid (1)
 1928/29 – Magpie (1)
 1927-28 – Valais (5)
 1926/27 – Valais (4)
 1925/26 – Valais (3)
 1924/25 – Valais (2)
 1923/24 – Valais (1)
 1922/23 – Comedy King (2)
 1921/22 – The Welkin (3)
 1920/21 – The Welkin (2)
 1919/20 – Comedy King (1)
 1918/19 – The Welkin (1)
 1917/18 – Linacre (2)
 1916/17 – Linacre (1)
 1915/16 – Wallace (1)
 1914/15 – Maltster (5)
 1913/14 – Maltster (4)
 1912/13 – Ayr Laddie (1)
 1911/12 – Maltster (3)
 1910/11 – Maltster (2)
 1909/10 – Maltster (1)
 1908/09 – Grafton (4)
 1907/08 – Grafton (3)
 1906/07 – Grafton (2)
 1905/06 – Lochiel (5)
 1904/05 – Lochiel (4)
 1903/04 – Grafton (1)
 1902/03 – Pilgrim's Progress (1)
 1901–/02 – Trenton (2)
 1900/01 – Lochiel (3)
 1899/1900 – Lochiel (2)
 1898/99 – Gozo (1)
 1897/98 – Lochiel (1)
 1896/97 – Newminster (2)
 1895/96 – Trenton (1)
 1894/95 – Grand Flaneur (1)
 1893/94 – Newminster (1)
 1892/93 – Chester (4)
 1891/92 – Chester (3)
 1890/91 – Musket (3)
 1889/90 – Chester (2)
 1888/89 – Musket (2)
 1887/88 – Chester (1)
 1886/87 – Robinson Crusoe (1)
 1885/86 – Musket (1)
 1884/85 – St Albans (2)
 1883/84 – St Albans (1)

References

See also

 Leading sire in France
 Leading sire in Germany
 Leading sire in Great Britain and Ireland
 Leading sire in Japan
 Leading broodmare sire in Japan
 Leading sire in North America
 Leading broodmare sire in Great Britain & Ireland
 Leading broodmare sire in North America

Horse racing in Australia